Shrdju is an ancient village in the Goghtn Region of Armenia, as of 2022 part of the Ordubad region of Nakhchivan.

In the second half of the 19th century the last Armenian population (60-80 families) left the village. The empty village has ruins of a church and other buildings.

Populated places in Ordubad District